Hagalu Vesha is a 2000 Indian Kannada-language film directed, written and scripted by Baraguru Ramachandrappa starring Shiva Rajkumar and Reshma.  It is the story of a man who revolts against the British rule and their taxation policy.

The film was critically acclaimed upon release and won numerous State awards. The music composed by Hamsalekha was also received positively.

Cast
 Shiva Rajkumar as Ramu
 Reshma
 Tara
 Jai Jagadish
 Nassar
 Pramila Joshai
 Bhavyasri Rai
 Karibasavaiah
 M. S. Umesh
 Krishne Gowda
 Aravind

Awards 
Karnataka State Film Awards
Karnataka State Film Award for Best Story - Baraguru Ramachandrappa
Karnataka State Film Award for Best Lyricist - Baraguru Ramachandrappa

Soundtrack
The music of the film was composed and lyrics written by Hamsalekha. Actor Rajkumar recorded a patriotic song "Jaggadu Jaggadu India" which became huge hit.

References

2000 films
Films directed by Baraguru Ramachandrappa
2000s Kannada-language films
Films scored by Hamsalekha
Films set in the British Raj
History of India on film
Indian historical films